Saint-Julien-en-Champsaur (Vivaro-Alpine: Sant Julian de Champsaur) is a commune in the Hautes-Alpes department in southeastern France.

Population

Notable residents

Vivian Maier
Street photographer Vivian Maier lived and photographed in the vicinity of Saint-Bonnet-en-Champsaur and Saint-Julien-en-Champsaur. While many details of Maier's life remain unknown, she was the daughter of a French mother, Maria Jaussaud, and several times during her childhood she moved between the U.S. and France, living with her mother in the Alpine village of Saint-Bonnet-en-Champsaur near her mother's relations. In 1935, Vivian and her mother, Maria, were living in Saint-Julien-en-Champsaur and prior to 1940 returned to New York City.

See also
Communes of the Hautes-Alpes department

References

Communes of Hautes-Alpes